The O’Connell School is a secondary and primary school for boys located on North Richmond Street in Dublin, Ireland. The school, named in honour of the leader of Catholic Emancipation, Daniel O’Connell, has the distinction of being the oldest surviving Christian Brothers school in Dublin, having been first established in 1829. It is now under the trusteeship of the Edmund Rice Schools Trust.

The school offers the Junior Certificate and Leaving Certificate programmes.

Notable staff and past pupils

A number of significant figures in Irish public life attended O'Connell's School.

Arts, journalism and entertainment
Paul Harrington - singer songwriter, Eurovision winner 1994 
Michael Holohan – composer, member and former chair of Aosdána.
James Joyce – writer who briefly attended the school; the school is mentioned in Dubliners in the story "Araby"
Pat Kenny – radio and television presenter
Barry Keoghan – film and television actor
Thomas Kinsella – poet and playwright
Declan Masterson – multi-instrumentalist, composer, former Musical Director @ Riverdance
Colm Meaney – film and television actor
Michael O'Hehir – radio broadcaster and sports commentator
Mícheál Ó Muircheartaigh – sports commentator who briefly taught at the O'Connell School
Luke Kelly – lead singer of folk group The Dubliners

Business and philanthropy
Bill Cullen – Irish businessman, philanthropist and star of The Apprentice

Science, medicine, technology, engineering and mathematics
Peter V. Delaney – Irish colorectal surgeon 
John Hooper – first Director of the Statistics Branch of the Department of Industry and Commerce in Ireland
William Mulholland – Irish-American dam civil engineer
Joseph Ó Ruanaidh – scientist

Politics
Maurice Ahern – Politician and Lord Mayor of Dublin 2000–2001
Brendan Bracken – British Minister of Information during the Second World War
Ray Burke – Fianna Fáil politician
Éamonn Ceannt – Irish Nationalist; one of the 1916 Easter Rising signatories
John A. Costello – Taoiseach
Tom Kettle – Nationalist MP and Irish Volunteer who died in the First World War
Seán Lemass – Taoiseach
P. J. Mara – Fianna Fáil public affairs consultant
Seán T. O'Kelly – second President of Ireland
John Stafford – TD and former Lord Mayor of Dublin
Nial Ring – Politician and Lord Mayor of Dublin 2018–2019
Lorcan Sherlock – Politician and Lord Mayor of Dublin 1912–1915

Religion 
Abraham Brownrigg - Bishop of Ossory (1884-1928)
James Kavanagh – University College Dublin professor and bishop in the Dublin Diocese

Sports 
Tom Farquharson - goalkeeper for Cardiff and Ireland, dubbed the penalty king
Bertie Kerr – Ireland football international and bloodstock agent
Paddy Neville – cricketer
Troy Parrott – professional footballer
Ronnie Delaney – Olympic Gold Medallist
Stephen Elliott - Professional footballer
Niall Brophy - athlete and rugby player

Veterans 
Paddy Finucane – World War II top-scoring fighter pilot ace in the RAF
Frank Flood – IRA officer executed in 1921 during the War of Independence; one of The Forgotten Ten
Seán Heuston – a leading member of the 1916 Easter Rising

References

External links
 

Congregation of Christian Brothers secondary schools in the Republic of Ireland
Boys' schools in the Republic of Ireland
Educational institutions established in 1829
Secondary schools in Dublin (city)
1829 establishments in Ireland